The Widewaters site, also designated 20AR245 , is an archaeological site located in Alger County, Michigan. It was used as a camp, and is near a stand of wild rice. It was listed on the National Register of Historic Places in 2014.

References

Further reading

Geography of Alger County, Michigan
Archaeological sites on the National Register of Historic Places in Michigan
National Register of Historic Places in Alger County, Michigan